The Canadian Pharmacists Association (CPhA), previously known as the Canadian Pharmaceutical Association, is an organization that serves as the professional association of Canadian pharmacists and pharmacy students. It was founded in 1907 in Toronto, Ontario. In 2014, CPhA adopted a new governance and membership model, most provincial pharmacy advocacy associations (PPAs) and select national pharmacist associations (NPAs) have become Organizational Members of CPhA. Their individual pharmacist and pharmacy student members are now CPhA Associates. The CPhA Board of Directors is made up of representatives appointed by each Organizational Member.  The Board of Directors is responsible for setting the broad direction of the association.

In 1923, CPhA became the publisher of the Canadian Pharmacists Journal, now Canada's oldest continuously published periodical. CPhA produces evidence-based drug and therapeutic resources for health care professionals in Canada.  CPhA is also a leading provider of continuing professional development aimed at helping Canadian pharmacists practice to their full potential.

CPhA is funded in part by sponsorships from pharmaceutical companies including Johnson & Johnson, Pfizer, and Teva Pharmaceuticals.

CPhA Organizational Members 

 Alberta Pharmacists Association (RxA) 
 Association of Faculties of Pharmacy of Canada (AFPC)
 Association québécoise des pharmaciens propriétaires (AQPP) 
 British Columbia Pharmacy Association (BCPhA) 
 Pharmacists Manitoba (PM) 
 New Brunswick Pharmacists Association (NBPA) 
 Ontario Pharmacists Association (OPA) 
 Pharmacists' Association of Newfoundland and Labrador (PANL) 
 Pharmacists' Association of Saskatchewan (PAS)
 Pharmacy Association of Nova Scotia (PANS) 
 Prince Edward Island Pharmacists Association (PEIPhA)

CPhA's Drug and Therapeutic Resources 

CPhA's publishing department produces the following evidence-based drug and therapeutic resources:

 Compendium of Pharmaceuticals and Specialties
 Compendium of Therapeutic Choices
 Compendium of Products for Minor Ailments
 Compendium of Therapeutics for Minor Ailments
 RxTx

CPhA's Continuing Professional Development Programs 

 Minor Ailments
 Lab Tests
 Medication Review Services
 QUIT
 Cannabis CE
 Pharmacogenomics for Community Pharmacists
 Managing Your Pharmacy: The Business Essentials

References

External links 
 Official Website
 Blueprint for Pharmacy Website

Pharmacy in Canada
Pharmacy-related professional associations
Organizations established in 1907
Pharmacy organizations in Canada
1907 establishments in Canada